2-Bromopyridine is an organic compound with the formula BrC5H4N.  It is a colorless liquid that is used as an intermediate in organic synthesis.  It can be prepared from 2-aminopyridine via diazotization followed by bromination.

Reactions
2-Bromopyridine reacts with butyllithium to give 2-lithiopyridine, which is a versatile reagent.  Pyrithione can be prepared in a two-step synthesis from 2-bromopyridine by oxidation to the N-oxide with a suitable peracid followed by substitution using either sodium dithionite or sodium sulfide with sodium hydroxide to introduce the thiol functional group.

References

2-Pyridyl compounds
Bromoarenes